Beth Wambui Mugo (born 11 July 1939 in Kiambu district) is a Kenyan politician. She belongs to Party of National Unity and was elected to represent the Dagoretti Constituency in the National Assembly of Kenya in the 2007 parliamentary election.

Political career 
Beth Mugo has had a successful career in politics. She was a nominated member of the Senate between 21 March 2013 → 16 July 2017. She was also a member of parliament for Dagoretti for The Party of National Unity. She was the Assistant Minister of Education (Cabinet) between 2006 and 2007. Between January and July 2003 she was the Asst. Minister for Tourism.

Currently, she is a nominated Senator. She began her work on 31 August 2017. Beth Mugo is also a member of the Jubilee Party as of January 2017. Lastly, she is a coalition member of Jubilee Alliance.

Other works 
She is the founder and a Trustee of The Beth Mugo Cancer Foundation. Senator Beth Mugo has extensive personal and professional experience with matters relating to cancer. During her appointment as Kenyan Minister for Public Health and Sanitation, Senator Mugo spearheaded the development of the National Cancer Control Strategy (2011-2016), the enactment of the Cancer Prevention and Control Act (2012), and the establishment of the National Cancer Institute of Kenya. She also expanded her fight against cancer across the continent when she served as Chairperson of the African Parliamentarians and Health Ministers against Breast, Cervical and Prostate Cancer (2012-2014).

References

External links
Beth Wambui Mugo biography at the Republic of Kenya Office of Public Communications
https://info.mzalendo.com/person/beth-mugo/experience/ 
http://www.bethmugocancerfoundation.org/BMFC/index.php

Living people
1939 births
Party of National Unity (Kenya) politicians
Members of the National Assembly (Kenya)
Kenyatta family
21st-century Kenyan women politicians
21st-century Kenyan politicians